Soliman Gamil (December 24, 1924 in Alexandria, Egypt – June 13, 1994) was an Egyptian composer and qanun player. In 1963, he began to experiment with the use of Egyptian traditional musical instruments in his compositions for films and theater, in an effort to evoke the sounds of Ancient Egypt.

He also wrote about music for the Al-Ahram newspaper.

Discography
1979 - Die Ägyptische Musik. Egyptian State Information Service BAR1.
1982 - L'Art Du Qânûn Egyptien. Arion ARN 36696.
1987 - The Egyptian Music. Touch TO:7.
1990 - Ankh. Touch TO:14.
1997 - A Map of Egypt Before the Sands. Touch T33.15.

See also
List of Egyptian composers

1924 births
1994 deaths
Egyptian composers
20th-century classical composers
Male classical composers
20th-century male musicians